Nemanja Vidić (born 6 August 1989) is a Serbian professional footballer who plays for China League One club Nanjing City as a defensive midfielder.

Club career

In 2017, he played in Malaysia for Negeri Sembilan.

On 29 July 2020, Vidić transferred to China League One club Sichuan Jiuniu.

On 15 April 2022, Vidić transferred to China League One club Nanjing City.

Career statistics 
Statistics accurate as of match played 31 December 2021.

References

External links
 

1989 births
Living people
Footballers from Belgrade
Serbian footballers
FK Zemun players
FK Javor Ivanjica players
FK Radnički 1923 players
FK Rad players
FK Novi Pazar players
Negeri Sembilan FA players
FK Budućnost Dobanovci players
FK Inđija players
Sichuan Jiuniu F.C. players
Nanjing City F.C. players
Serbian SuperLiga players
China League One players
Serbian expatriate footballers
Serbian expatriate sportspeople in Slovenia
Serbian expatriate sportspeople in Malaysia
Serbian expatriate sportspeople in China
Expatriate footballers in Slovenia
Expatriate footballers in Malaysia
Expatriate footballers in China
Association football midfielders